The FIDE Women's Grand Prix 2009–2011 was a series of six chess tournaments exclusively for women, which formed part of the qualification cycle for the Women's World Chess Championship 2011. The winner of the Grand Prix (the one with most Grand Prix points) was to challenge Hou Yifan—the 2010 world champion— in the third quarter of 2011. As Hou Yifan also won the Grand Prix, Koneru Humpy as the runner-up qualified for the championship match.

The final tournament was originally scheduled to take place in Santiago de Chile starting on October 23, 2010. However, due to problems with financing, the host was replaced and the final tournament was then played in Doha, Qatar.

Format
Eighteen of the top female players in the world were to be selected to compete in these tournaments. Each player would contract to participate in exactly 4 of these tournaments. Players must rank their preference of tournaments once the final list of host cities was announced and the dates allocated to each host city.

Each tournament was staged as a 12-player, single round-robin tournament. In each round players scored 1 point for a win, ½ point for a draw and 0 for a loss. Grand prix points were then allocated according to each player's standing in the tournament: 160 points for first place, 130 for second place, 110 for third place, and then 90 down to 10 points for places four to twelve (decreasing by 10 points for each place). Grand Prix points were split between players on equal tournament points.

Players only counted their best three tournament results in the overall standings. The player with the most total grand prix points for those three tournaments was the winner.

Players and qualification
The 18 players qualified were:

 The top four from the World Championship 2008:
Alexandra Kosteniuk (declined to participate), Hou Yifan, Pia Cramling, and Koneru Humpy.
 The six highest rated players (average of October 2007 and October 2008 lists) not already qualified:
Judit Polgár (declined), Susan Polgar (declined), Xie Jun (declined), Zhao Xue, Marie Sebag, and Zhu Chen.
 Two players nominated by the FIDE president:
Nana Dzagnidze and Elina Danielian.
 One nominee from each of the six host cities:
Betul Cemre Yildiz (Istanbul), Shen Yang (Nanjing), Zeinab Mamedyarova, Lilit Mkrtchian (Jermuk), Batkhuyag Munguntuul (Ulaanbaataar), and Martha Fierro (Santiago).

The four players who declined to participate were replaced by the following reserves (on rating): Antoaneta Stefanova, Tatiana Kosintseva, Maia Chiburdanidze, and Xu Yuhua. Although Santiago was replaced as host city by Doha, their nominee Fierro was allowed to stay in the series.

Mamedyarova was excluded from the series after the first tournament in Istanbul and replaced by Baira Kovanova due to change of host city to Nalchik. Kosintseva was unable to play in Nanjing and reserve Ju Wenjun took her place in that tournament.

Tie-breaks
With the objective of determining a clear, single winner to play in the championship match in the case that two or more players had equal cumulative points at the top, the following criteria (in descending order) would be utilized to decide the overall winner:
 The fourth result not already in the top three performances
 The number of actual game points scored in the four tournaments
 The number of first-place finishes
 The number of second-place finishes
 The number of won games
 Drawing of lots

Prize money and Grand Prix points
The prize fund was €40,000 per Grand Prix event and €60,000 for the overall Grand Prix placement.

Schedule and results

Events crosstables
{| class="wikitable" style="text-align: center;"
|+ Istanbul, March 2009
|-
! !! !! Rating !! 1 !! 2 !! 3 !! 4 !! 5 !! 6 !! 7 !! 8 !! 9 !! 10 !! 11 !! 12 !! Score !! Tie break
|-
| 1  || align=left| Koneru Humpy || 2621 || - || 1 || 0 || ½ || 1 || 1 || 1 || 1 || 1 || ½ || 1 || ½ || 8½ || 
|-
| 2  || align=left| Elina Danielian || 2496 || 0 || - || ½ || 1 || 1 || ½ || 1 || 1 || 1 || ½ || ½ || 1 || 8 || 40.25
|-
| 3  || align=left| Hou Yifan || 2571 || 1 || ½ || - || 0 || ½ || 1 || 1 || 1 || ½ || ½ || 1 || 1 || 8 || 39.75
|-
| 4  || align=left| Zhao Xue || 2508 || ½ || 0 || 1 || - || 0 || 1 || 1 || ½ || ½ || 1 || 1 || 1 || 7½ || 
|-
| 5  || align=left| Marie Sebag || 2529 || 0 || 0 || ½ || 1 || - || ½ || 1 || 0 || ½ || ½ || 1 || 1 || 6 || 
|-
| 6  || align=left| Pia Cramling || 2548 || 0 || ½ || 0 || 0 || ½ || - || 0 || 1 || 1 || 1 || ½ || 1 || 5½ || 22.75
|-
| 7  || align=left| Martha Fierro || 2403 || 0 || 0 || 0 || 0 || 0 || 1 || - || ½ || 1 || 1 || 1 || 1 || 5½ || 20.00
|-
| 8  || align=left| Antoaneta Stefanova || 2557 || 0 || 0 || 0 || ½ || 1 || 0 || ½ || - || ½ || ½ || 1 || 1 || 5 || 20.75
|-
| 9  || align=left| Maia Chiburdanidze || 2516 || 0 || 0 || ½ || ½ || ½ || 0 || 0 || ½ || - || 1 || 1 || 1 || 5 || 20.25
|-
| 10 || align=left| Shen Yang || 2448 || ½ || ½ || ½ || 0 || ½ || 0 || 0 || ½ || 0 || - || 0 || 0 || 2½ || 17.75
|-
| 11 || align=left| Zeinab Mamedyarova || 2362 || 0 || ½ || 0 || 0 || 0 || ½ || 0 || 0 || 0 || 1 || - || ½ || 2½ || 10.25
|-
| 12 || align=left| Betul Cemre Yildiz || 2214 || ½ || 0 || 0 || 0 || 0 || 0 || 0 || 0 || 0 || 1 || ½ || - || 2 || 
|}

{| class="wikitable" style="text-align: center;"
|+ Nanjing, September–October 2009
|-
! !! !! Rating !! 1 !! 2 !! 3 !! 4 !! 5 !! 6 !! 7 !! 8 !! 9 !! 10 !! 11 !! 12 !! Score !! Tie break
|-
| 1  || align=left| Xu Yuhua || 2485 || - || 0 || ½ || ½ || 1 || 1 || 1 || 0 || 1 || 1 || 1 || 1 || 8 || 
|-
| 2  || align=left| Nana Dzagnidze || 2535 || 1 || - || ½ || 0 || ½ || 1 || 0 || ½ || 1 || 1 || 1 || 1 || 7½ || 
|-
| 3  || align=left| Zhao Xue || 2542 || ½ || ½ || - || 1 || 0 || 0 || 1 || ½ || ½ || 1 || 1 || 1 || 7 || 
|-
| 4  || align=left| Marie Sebag || 2519 || ½ || 1 || 0 || - || ½ || 1 || 0 || 1 || 0 || 1 || ½ || 1 || 6½ || 33.25
|-
| 5  || align=left| Lilit Mkrtchian || 2468 || 0 || ½ || 1 || ½ || - || ½ || ½ || ½ || ½ || ½ || 1 || 1 || 6½ || 30.75
|-
| 6  || align=left| Ju Wenjun || 2443 || 0 || 0 || 1 || 0 || ½ || - || 1 || 1 || ½ || ½ || 1 || 1 || 6½ || 29.50
|-
| 7  || align=left| Shen Yang || 2453 || 0 || 1 || 0 || 1 || ½ || 0 || - || ½ || ½ || 1 || ½ || 1 || 6 || 
|-
| 8  || align=left| Batkhuyag Munguntuul || 2418 || 1 || ½ || ½ || 0 || ½ || 0 || ½ || - || ½ || 0 || 1 || 1 || 5½ || 20.75
|-
| 9  || align=left| Baira Kovanova || 2408 || 0 || 0 || ½ || 1 || ½ || ½ || ½ || ½ || - || 0 || ½ || 1 || 5 || 
|-
| 10 || align=left| Zhu Chen || 2488 || 0 || 0 || 0 || 0 || ½ || ½ || 0 || 1 || 1 || - || ½ || 1 || 4½ || 
|-
| 11 || align=left| Martha Fierro || 2386 || 0 || 0 || 0 || ½ || 0 || 0 || ½ || 0 || ½ || ½ || - || 0 || 2 || 
|-
| 12 || align=left| Betul Cemre Yildiz || 2224 || 0 || 0 || 0 || 0 || 0 || 0 || 0 || 0 || 0 || 0 || 1 || - || 1 || 
|}

{| class="wikitable" style="text-align: center;"
|+ Nalchik, April 2010
|-
! !! !! Rating !! 1 !! 2 !! 3 !! 4 !! 5 !! 6 !! 7 !! 8 !! 9 !! 10 !! 11 !! 12 !! Score !! Tie break
|-
| 1  || align=left| Tatiana Kosintseva || 2536 || - || 1 || 1 || 1 || ½ || ½ || 1 || ½ || 1 || 1 || ½ || 1 || 9 || 
|-
| 2  || align=left| Hou Yifan || 2585 || 0 || - || 0 || ½ || ½ || 1 || 1 || 1 || ½ || 1 || 1 || 1 || 7½ || 
|-
| 3  || align=left| Nana Dzagnidze || 2535 || 0 || 1 || - || ½ || ½ || ½ || ½ || ½ || ½ || 1 || 1 || 1 || 7 || 33.25
|-
| 4  || align=left| Pia Cramling || 2535 || 0 || ½ || ½ || - || ½ || 1 || ½ || ½ || ½ || 1 || 1 || 1 || 7 || 32.25
|-
| 5  || align=left| Koneru Humpy || 2595 || ½ || ½ || ½ || ½ || - || 0 || 0 || 0 || 1 || ½ || 1 || 1 || 5½ || 26.75
|-
| 6  || align=left| Zhu Chen || 2488 || ½ || 0 || ½ || 0 || 1 || - || 0 || ½ || 1 || ½ || 1 || ½ || 5½ || 26.75
|-
| 7  || align=left| Batkhuyag Munguntuul || 2418 || 0 || 0 || ½ || ½ || 1 || 1 || - || 0 || 1 || 0 || ½ || 1 || 5½ || 25.75
|-
| 8  || align=left| Zhao Xue || 2542 || ½ || 0 || ½ || ½ || 1 || ½ || 1 || - || 0 || 0 || 0 || 1 || 5 || 26.75
|-
| 9  || align=left| Lilit Mkrtchian || 2468 || 0 || ½ || ½ || ½ || 0 || 0 || 0 || 1 || - || 1 || 1 || ½ || 5 || 24.00
|-
| 10 || align=left| Baira Kovanova || 2408 || 0 || 0 || 0 || 0 || ½ || ½ || 1 || 1 || 0 || - || 1 || 1 || 5 || 20.00
|-
| 11 || align=left| Betul Cemre Yildiz || 2224 || ½ || 0 || 0 || 0 || 0 || 0 || ½ || 1 || 0 || 0 || - || ½ || 2½ || 
|-
| 12 || align=left| Elina Danielian || 2489 || 0 || 0 || 0 || 0 || 0 || ½ || 0 || 0 || ½ || 0 || ½ || - || 1½ || 
|}

{| class="wikitable" style="text-align: center;"
|+ Jermuk, June–July 2010
|-
! !! !! Rating !! 1 !! 2 !! 3 !! 4 !! 5 !! 6 !! 7 !! 8 !! 9 !! 10 !! 11 !! 12 !! Score !! Tie break
|-
| 1  || align=left| Nana Dzagnidze || 2535 || - || 1 || 1 || 1 || 1 || ½ || ½ || ½ || 1 || ½ || 1 || 1 || 9 || 
|-
| 2  || align=left| Tatiana Kosintseva || 2536 || 0 || - || 0 || ½ || ½ || 1 || ½ || 1 || 1 || 1 || 1 || 1 || 7½ || 
|-
| 3  || align=left| Elina Danielian || 2489 || 0 || 1 || - || ½ || 0 || ½ || ½ || 1 || 1 || ½ || 1 || ½ || 6½ || 32.25
|-
| 4  || align=left| Lilit Mkrtchian || 2468 || 0 || ½ || ½ || - || 1 || 0 || ½ || ½ || 1 || 1 || ½ || 1 || 6½ || 30.50
|-
| 5  || align=left| Antoaneta Stefanova || 2527 || 0 || ½ || 1 || 0 || - || 0 || ½ || 1 || 1 || 1 || ½ || 1 || 6½ || 30.00
|-
| 6  || align=left| Hou Yifan || 2585 || ½ || 0 || ½ || 1 || 1 || - || 1 || 0 || ½ || 0 || ½ || 1 || 6 || 
|-
| 7  || align=left| Pia Cramling || 2535 || ½ || ½ || ½ || ½ || ½ || 0 || - || ½ || 0 || ½ || 1 || 1 || 5½ || 27.25
|-
| 8  || align=left| Shen Yang || 2453 || ½ || 0 || 0 || ½ || 0 || 1 || ½ || - || ½ || ½ || 1 || 1 || 5½ || 25.25
|-
| 9  || align=left| Maia Chiburdanidze || 2506 || 0 || 0 || 0 || 0 || 0 || ½ || 1 || ½ || - || 1 || ½ || 1 || 4½ || 
|-
| 10 || align=left| Xu Yuhua || 2485 || ½ || 0 || ½ || 0 || 0 || 1 || ½ || ½ || 0 || - || 1 || 0 || 4 || 
|-
| 11 || align=left| Baira Kovanova || 2408 || 0 || 0 || 0 || ½ || ½ || ½ || 0 || 0 || ½ || 0 || - || 1 || 3 || 
|-
| 12 || align=left| Martha Fierro || 2386 || 0 || 0 || ½ || 0 || 0 || 0 || 0 || 0 || 0 || 1 || 0 || - || 1½ || 
|}

{| class="wikitable" style="text-align: center;"
|+ Ulaanbaatar, July–August 2010
|-
! !! !! Rating !! 1 !! 2 !! 3 !! 4 !! 5 !! 6 !! 7 !! 8 !! 9 !! 10 !! 11 !! 12 !! Score !! Tie break
|-
| 1  || align=left| Hou Yifan || 2585 || - || ½ || ½ || ½ || ½ || ½ || 1 || ½ || 1 || 1 || 1 || 1 || 8 || 
|-
| 2  || align=left| Antoaneta Stefanova || 2527 || ½ || - || 0 || 0 || 1 || ½ || 1 || 1 || ½ || 1 || 1 || 1 || 7½ || 
|-
| 3  || align=left| Koneru Humpy || 2595 || ½ || 1 || - || 0 || ½ || 1 || ½ || 1 || ½ || 1 || 0 || ½ || 6½ || 36.00
|-
| 4  || align=left| Zhao Xue || 2542 || ½ || 1 || 1 || - || 0 || 1 || 0 || 0 || 1 || ½ || ½ || 1 || 6½ || 34.75
|-
| 5  || align=left| Tatiana Kosintseva || 2536 || ½ || 0 || ½ || 1 || - || ½ || ½ || ½ || 1 || 0 || 1 || 1 || 6½ || 32.50
|-
| 6  || align=left| Maia Chiburdanidze || 2506 || ½ || ½ || 0 || 0 || ½ || - || 1 || ½ || 0 || 1 || 1 || 1 || 6 || 
|-
| 7  || align=left| Xu Yuhua || 2485 || 0 || 0 || ½ || 1 || ½ || 0 || - || ½ || ½ || ½ || 1 || 1 || 5½ || 
|-
| 8  || align=left| Shen Yang || 2453 || ½ || 0 || 0 || 1 || ½ || ½ || ½ || - || ½ || ½ || 0 || 1 || 5 || 26.00
|-
| 9  || align=left| Zhu Chen || 2488 || 0 || ½ || ½ || 0 || 0 || 1 || ½ || ½ || - || 1 || 1 || 0 || 5 || 25.75
|-
| 10 || align=left| Marie Sebag || 2519 || 0 || 0 || 0 || ½ || 1 || 0 || ½ || ½ || 0 || - || 1 || ½ || 4 || 
|-
| 11 || align=left| Batkhuyag Munguntuul || 2418 || 0 || 0 || 1 || ½ || 0 || 0 || 0 || 1 || 0 || 0 || - || 1 || 3½ || 
|-
| 12 || align=left| Betul Cemre Yildiz || 2224 || 0 || 0 || ½ || 0 || 0 || 0 || 0 || 0 || 1 || ½ || 0 || - || 2 || 
|}

{| class="wikitable" style="text-align: center;"
|+ Doha, February–March 2011
|-
! !! !! Rating !! 1 !! 2 !! 3 !! 4 !! 5 !! 6 !! 7 !! 8 !! 9 !! 10 !! 11 !! 12 !! Score !! Tie break
|-
| 1  || align=left| Koneru Humpy || 2595 || - || 1 || ½ || ½ || 0 || 1 || 1 || ½ || 1 || 1 || ½ || 1 || 8 || 41.75
|-
| 2  || align=left| Elina Danielian || 2489 || 0 || - || 1 || 0 || 1 || 1 || 1 || 1 || ½ || 1 || ½ || 1 || 8 || 40.25
|-
| 3  || align=left| Marie Sebag || 2519 || ½ || 0 || - || 1 || 1 || ½ || 0 || 1 || ½ || 1 || ½ || 1 || 7 || 
|-
| 4  || align=left| Pia Cramling || 2535 || ½ || 1 || 0 || - || 1 || ½ || 0 || 0 || ½ || ½ || 1 || ½ || 5½ || 30.50
|-
| 5  || align=left| Nana Dzagnidze || 2536 || 1 || 0 || 0 || 0 || - || ½ || 1 || 1 || 1 || 0 || 1 || 0 || 5½ || 29.25
|-
| 6  || align=left| Maia Chiburdanidze || 2506 || 0 || 0 || ½ || ½ || ½ || - || 0 || 1 || 1 || 1 || ½ || ½ || 5½ || 26.75
|-
| 7  || align=left| Batkhuyag Munguntuul || 2418 || 0 || 0 || 1 || 1 || 0 || 1 || - || 0 || ½ || 0 || ½ || 1 || 5 || 25.75
|-
| 8  || align=left| Xu Yuhua || 2485 || ½ || 0 || 0 || 1 || 0 || 0 || 1 || - || 0 || 1 || 1 || ½ || 5 || 24.75
|-
| 9  || align=left| Lilit Mkrtchian || 2468 || 0 || ½ || ½ || ½ || 0 || 0 || ½ || 1 || - || ½ || 0 || 1 || 4½ || 23.50
|-
| 10 || align=left| Martha Fierro || 2386 || 0 || 0 || 0 || ½ || 1 || 0 || 1 || 0 || ½ || - || ½ || 1 || 4½ || 21.00
|-
| 11 || align=left| Antoaneta Stefanova || 2527 || ½ || ½ || ½ || 0 || 0 || ½ || ½ || 0 || 1 || ½ || - || 0 || 4 || 
|-
| 12 || align=left| Zhu Chen || 2488 || 0 || 0 || 0 || ½ || 1 || ½ || 0 || ½ || 0 || 0 || 1 || - || 3½ || 
|}

Grand Prix standings
The Grand Prix was won by Hou Yifan, but as she was already qualified for the championship match as title holder, runner-up Koneru Humpy qualified as challenger. Her tied first place in Doha was just enough to overtake Nana Dzagnidze and secure second place in the overall standings.

See also
FIDE Women's Grand Prix 2011–12, the next series
FIDE Grand Prix 2008–2010, the men's equivalent

References

External links
 
 Detailed Tournament results and standings

Women's chess competitions
FIDE Grand Prix
2009 in chess
2010 in chess
2011 in chess